The Tahoma Glacier is a long glacier mostly on the western flank of Mount Rainier in Washington. As the glacier drops below , it broadens and joins the smaller South Tahoma Glacier. Meltwater from the glacier is the source of the South Puyallup River and Tahoma Creek, a tributary of the Nisqually River.

See also
South Tahoma Glacier
List of glaciers

References

Glaciers of Mount Rainier
Glaciers of Washington (state)